In phonology and phonetics, anterior consonants refer to consonants articulated in the front of the mouth; they comprise the labial consonants, dental consonants and alveolar consonants. Retroflex and palatal consonants, as well as all consonants articulated further back in the mouth, are usually excluded.

Some versions of featural phonology posit anterior consonants to be characterized by a phonological feature [+anterior], and distinguish labial consonants by the feature [+labial]. Under this scheme, there is no feature such as [dental], and dental or alveolar consonants are simply modelled as the unmarked counterpart of the labial consonants: [+anterior], [-labial].

Phonology
Phonetics